Don Gilbert (born October 6, 1943) was a Canadian football player and coach. He played four seasons in the Canadian Football League for the Ottawa Rough Riders and Winnipeg Blue Bombers. He then went on to coach four seasons for the Ottawa Gee-Gees, winning the Vanier Cup in 1975. He played college football for the Buffalo Bulls.

He played high school football while attending Bennett High School in Buffalo, New York.

References

1943 births
Living people
Players of American football from New York (state)
Canadian football defensive backs
Ottawa Rough Riders players
Winnipeg Blue Bombers players
Ottawa Gee-Gees football coaches
Buffalo Bulls football players